Smithton (Gaelic: Baile a' Ghobhainn) is a residential area on the eastern outskirts of the city of Inverness, in the Highland council area of Scotland. It is located about 5 km east of the city centre, to the north-east of Westhill, and to the south-west of Culloden.

It is traditionally seen as a working class area due to the large number of former council housing. The last ten years has seen much growth in housing and houses being built in Smithton but being addressed as other areas such as Culloden Woods.

References

Areas of Inverness
Populated places in Inverness committee area